= Abdaikl =

Abdaikl (Russian: Абдаи́кл) is an old and rare Russian male first name of Arabic or Persian origin. The patronymics derived from this first name are "Абдаи́клович" (Abdaiklovich; masculine) and "Абдаи́кловна" (Abdaiklovna; feminine).
